This is a list of Dayton Flyers football players in the NFL Draft.

Key

Selections

References

Dayton

Dayton Flyers NFL Draft